Pedro Mendy (1872 – 21 October 1943) was a Uruguayan fencer. He competed in the individual and team sabre and individual foil events at the 1924 Summer Olympics.

References

External links
 

1872 births
1943 deaths
Uruguayan male sabre fencers
Olympic fencers of Uruguay
Fencers at the 1924 Summer Olympics
Uruguayan male foil fencers